Berndt Robert Gustaf Stackelberg, born January 12, 1784, in Turku County, Finland, died November 10, 1845, in Stockholm, Sweden, was a Swedish military officer and diplomat. Stackelberg was governor of the Swedish colony of St. Barthélemy in the West Indies 1812-1816, and chargé d'affaires of Sweden's diplomatic mission to the United States, 1819–1831.

Early life
Stackelberg was born as the second son of Berndt Magnus Stackelberg (1755–1815) and his first wife Baroness Ottiliana Ulrica De Geer af Tervik (1760–1798). The father was then an officer in the Turku County Infantry Regiment. Stackelberg followed in his father's footsteps and joined the army. In 1800 he was commissioned cornet in the Life Guards of Horse and was promoted to lieutenant in 1805. Stackelberg distinguished himself in the Battle of Sävar in 1809 where he was wounded in action, and was brevetted major and appointed assistant adjutant general. Later that year he became a knight of the Order of the Sword and commissioned major in the Scanian Carabineer Regiment. Stackelberg was brevetted lieutenant colonel in 1811.

Governor of St. Barthélemy
Stackelberg served as governor of the Swedish colony of St. Barthélemy in the West Indies from February 14, 1812, to October 20, 1816.  

En 1784, l'île de Saint-Barthélemy est cédée par Louis XVI au roi Gustave III de Suède contre un droit d'entrepôt à Göteborg. En 1877, l’ile est rétrocédée à la France par le roi Charles XIII de Suède et est rattachée à l'île française la Guadeloupe le 16 mars 1878.

Swedish chargé d'affaires in Washington
Having returned to Sweden, Stackelberg resigned his commission in the Scanian Carabineers. Brevetted colonel in 1818 and commissioned colonel of the General Staff in 1819. The following year he was appointed Swedish chargé d'affaires in Washington. Promoted to adjutant-general 1828 while in diplomatic service.  He presented his credentials in Washington, November 14, 1819, and took leave June 6, 1832.

Family life
Stackelberg remained unmarried and died November 10, 1845, in Stockholm, Sweden.

References

1784 births
1845 deaths
People from Turku
Swedish people of German descent
Swedish nobility
Recipients of the Order of the Sword
Swedish generals
Swedish colonial governors of Saint Barthélémy
Ambassadors of Sweden to the United States
Berndt Robert Gustaf
https://fr.wikipedia.org/wiki/Liste_des_gouverneurs_et_maires_de_Saint-Barth%C3%A9lemy